Ashwood is a ghost town in Jefferson County, Oregon, United States,  northeast of Madras.

Ashwood was named for its proximity to Ash Butte, a butte with volcanic ash deposits on its sides, and to honor Whitfield T. Wood, who settled in the area in the 1870s. Ashwood post office was established in 1898.

The Ashwood area was first used by the Native American Sahaptin and Northern Paiute people. After the Sahaptin were forced to move to the Warm Springs Indian Reservation in the 1850s, and the Northern Paiute were defeated in the 1870s, settlers moved into the area to raise cattle and sheep. Sheep ranching became an important local industry by 1900 because of the availability of the railroad in nearby Shaniko that facilitated the shipping of wool. Ashwood became a gold- and silver-mining boomtown in the 1910s. The Oregon King Mine was an important mine that was established during the early boom period. The minerals soon began to play out, however, and local residents turned back to ranching and agriculture as the mainstays of their economy.

Ashwood is popular with rockhounds, as the area has an abundance of petrified wood, jasper, and thundereggs—Oregon's state rock.

Climate
This region experiences warm (but not hot) and dry summers, with no average monthly temperatures above 71.6 °F.  According to the Köppen Climate Classification system, Ashwood has a warm-summer Mediterranean climate, abbreviated "Csb" on climate maps.

See also
List of ghost towns in Oregon

References

External links
Communities: Ashwood – Madras-Jefferson County Chamber of Commerce

Ghost towns in Oregon
Former populated places in Jefferson County, Oregon
1898 establishments in Oregon
Populated places established in 1898